Greenville Downtown Airport  is an airport three miles east of Greenville, South Carolina, United States. It is owned by the Greenville Airport Commission and is the busiest general aviation airport in South Carolina.

The National Plan of Integrated Airport Systems for 2011–2015 categorized it as a general aviation facility.

History

GMU opened in 1928 as Greenville Municipal Airport. In 1930 it received its first airmail flight.  Amelia Earhart flew demonstration flights at GMU in an Autogiro for the Beech-Nut Company in November 1931.  Eastern Airlines began scheduled flights in the late 1930s and Delta Airlines arrived in 1945.

During World War II the United States Army Air Forces used the airfield for training. The airport was used jointly by the Army Air Forces Flying Training Command, Southeast Training Center (later Eastern Flying Training Command) as a contract glider training school, operated by Southern Airways, Inc.  The 19th AAF Glider Training Detachment was a Basic training school active from September 1942 until March 1943 using Aeronca TG-5 and Laister-Kauffmann TG-4A training gliders. The airport was then reassigned to Air Technical Service Command and used as a supply and maintenance depot until being returned to full civil control in October 1945.

Until 1962 GMU (then GRL) was the commercial airport for the Greenville area; in April 1957 it had 13 weekday departures on Eastern, four on Delta and four on Southern. Eastern had one nonstop to Richmond, but no other nonstops out of Greenville exceeded 200 miles.

Commercial service moved to Greenville-Spartanburg Airport when it opened on October 15, 1962.

On October 20, 1977, a Convair CV-240 aircraft carrying members of the band Lynyrd Skynyrd departed from this airport. The plane would later crash, killing multiple members of the band, as well as the pilot and co-pilot.

The recently renovated terminal won a national award.

Facilities
Greenville Downtown Airport covers 385 acres (156 ha) at an elevation of 1,048 feet (319 m). It has two asphalt runways: 1/19 is 5,393 by 100 feet (1,644 x 30 m) and 10/28 is 3,998 by 80 feet (1,219 x 24 m). It has two helipads, each concrete 50 by 50 feet (15 x 15 m).

The Airport Commission recently completed extensive runway, taxiway, and apron improvements, a major terminal renovation, and construction of a new road that made additional land available for development.

Located at GMU are many companies that provide aviation services like aircraft rental, flight instruction, aircraft maintenance, helicopter services, aircraft management, fuel service, aircraft sales, air charter and air taxi.

GMU has a restaurant, the Runway Cafe, and a public park where people can learn about aviation.

In 2016, the airport had 91,612 aircraft operations, average 412 per day: 65% general aviation, 32% air taxi, and 3% military. 410 aircraft are based at this airport. It is located south of Interstate 385 and east of North Pleasantburg Drive in Greenville.

Governance
The Greenville Downtown Airport is governed by a five-person appointed Commission authorized by Act 919. Two appointees each from city and county councils, and one at-large, serve three-year terms.

Economic impact
The South Carolina Statewide Aviation System Plan & Economic Impact Report released in 2018 concluded that in 2017 the Greenville Downtown Airport (GMU) had a significant annual economic impact on the state of South Carolina and our local region.  They determined that GMU had the following direct and indirect/induced economic impact:
 Employment:  547
 Payroll:  $24.9 million
 Economic activity:  $68.8 million

Air traffic
GMU's air traffic is heavier than any other general aviation airport in South Carolina and is topped by only three commercial airports (Myrtle Beach International, Charleston International/Air Force Base and Columbia Metropolitan) in South Carolina.

Based aircraft
GMU has more based aircraft than any other airport in South Carolina.

Awards

The FAA Southern Region selected GMU to receive its General Aviation Airport Safety Award. The award is presented to a general aviation airport in the Southeast that makes outstanding efforts to increase flight safety. GMU accomplished this by completing numerous safety-enhancing projects. Of particular note, GMU was the first general aviation airport in the nation to install an Engineered Material Arresting System (EMAS) in the latter part of 2003. EMAS rapidly and safely decelerates aircraft that have overrun the active runway by utilizing energy absorbing material. In the summer of 2006, this system was credited with saving five passengers and a $20 million Falcon 900 jet that overran Runway 1 due to a brake malfunction.

The FAA Southern Region selected Joe Frasher, Airport Director of GMU, as the 2008 General Aviation Airport Manager of the Year. This award is presented to a general aviation airport manager in the Southeast who makes outstanding efforts to increase flight safety. Frasher had been instrumental in completing numerous safety-enhancing projects at GMU over the previous 26 years.

"The staff of the Greenville Downtown Airport is distinguished in its commitment to continually increasing flight safety," said Rusty Chapman, recently retired Manager of the Airports Division, FAA Southern Region. "They accomplished a significant number of safety upgrades while still successfully operating the state's busiest general aviation airport."

The award was presented to Frasher at the 2009 FAA Communications Conference in Atlanta on January 30, 2009.

See also

 South Carolina World War II Army Airfields
 29th Flying Training Wing (World War II)
 List of airports in South Carolina

References

 

 Manning, Thomas A. (2005), History of Air Education and Training Command, 1942–2002.  Office of History and Research, Headquarters, AETC, Randolph AFB, Texas 
 Shaw, Frederick J. (2004), Locating Air Force Base Sites, History’s Legacy, Air Force History and Museums Program, United States Air Force, Washington DC.

External links
 Greenville Downtown Airport
 
 

Airports in South Carolina
Buildings and structures in Greenville, South Carolina
Transportation in Greenville County, South Carolina
Airfields of the United States Army Air Forces in South Carolina
USAAF Contract Flying School Airfields
USAAF Glider Training Airfields
Airports established in 1928
1928 establishments in South Carolina